Joseph Erskine Agnew was a musician, arranger, music store proprietor, and music publisher in Des Moines, Iowa and later Newton, Iowa briefly. He played the mandolin. He became a nationally prominent band music publisher. Sheet music published by his Agnew Music Publishing Company is in the collections of the Library of Congress, the University of Missouri-Kansas City, and the University of Rochester.

He acquired "Nappy Lee" from Joe Jordan (musician). The sheet music Agnew published for it is part of the Library of Congress holdings.

He wrote "The 20th Century Method for Guitar" (1901, 1907). He published "Musical Novelties for Mandolin Orchestra: The Cleveland Two Step".

He copyrighted a valse by Myron A. Bickford. He also copyrighted an arrangement of a work by J. Offenbach.

In 1917 he advertised various compositions of New Band Music in the Musical Messenger.

He moved his business to Newton, Iowa where he was a band leader. He copyrighted an arrangement of concert waltzes by Guy Sterling (musician) for the mandolin.

He sold his store to the Volkwein Brothers of Pittsburgh in 1939.

References

American composers
American music publishers (people)
People from Des Moines, Iowa
People from Newton, Iowa
People from Kansas City, Missouri
Mandolinists
Year of birth missing (living people)
Living people